Henri Eugène Lucien Gaëtan Coemans (30 October 1825, Brussels – 8 January 1871, Ghent) was a Belgian Catholic priest and botanist.

In 1848 he obtained his ordination, later serving as a curate in Ghent (from 1853). In 1864 he became a member of the Académie royale des Sciences et Belles-Lettres de Bruxelles, followed by a professorship at the Catholic University of Leuven in 1866. From 1868 to 1871 he was director of a Franciscan convent in Ghent.

As a taxonomist he identified the genus Fittonia (family Acanthaceae). The genus Coemansia is named in his honor.

Selected works 
 Monographie du genre Pilobolus, Tode, spècialement ètudiè au point de vue anatomique et physiologique, 1861 - Monograph of the genus Pilobolus. 
 Spicilège mycologique, 1862 - Mycological scrapbook.
 Notices biographiques sur quelques lichenographes celebres, 1864 - Biographical notices of some celebrated lichenologists.
 Monographie des Spenophyllum d'Europe (with Jean Jacques Kickx), 1864 - Monograph on Sphenophyllum of Europe. 
 Description de la flore fossile du premier ètage du terrain crètacè du Hainaut, 1867 - Description of fossil flora from the first stage of the Cretaceous terrain in Hainaut.

References 

1825 births
1871 deaths
Clergy from Brussels
19th-century Belgian botanists
Scientists from Brussels